Lost in a Dream is the fourth studio album by REO Speedwagon, released in 1974. It peaked at number 98 on the Billboard 200 chart in 1975, It was the second album to feature Mike Murphy on vocals. The title track was written by Murphy and future bassist Bruce Hall, who would join the band in 1978. The title track was featured on the compilation A Decade of Rock and Roll: 1970-1980. The album was in print on CD format in 1992 for two months before being quickly deleted.

Track listing

Personnel
REO Speedwagon
Mike Murphy - lead vocals
Gary Richrath – guitar, lead vocals on "Wild as the Western Wind"
Neal Doughty – keyboards
Gregg Philbin – bass, backing vocals
Alan Gratzer – drums, backing vocals
Technical
Mike D. Stone - engineer
Jimmy Wachtel - album design
Lorrie Sullivan - photography

"Special thanks to Chris Stone and Gary Kellgren. Thanks a lot to: Irv Azoff, John Baruck, C. B. and Abe, Turkey (John) Durkin (Ace pilot and general good guy), Roger Douglas Marcum (Stain), Michael Anglin, Mick Joyce, Andy Green (The Grouch), Jody Boyer, Pat Craven, Pate Deters, Bub Phillipe, Karen Douglas, Lick, Kracker, Al, Joe Walsh and Barnstorm, The Doobie Brothers, Tony and the Toucholes, Terry Bassett, Don Ellis, Ron Alexenburg, Michael Sunday, Lee Trippett, Artie Patsiner and Tom Ross, St. Louis, Kansas City and Indianapolis."

Charts
Album - Billboard (United States)

Release history

References

REO Speedwagon albums
1974 albums
Epic Records albums
Albums with cover art by Jimmy Wachtel